Tejan Koroma (born April 27, 1996) is an American football center for the Seattle Sea Dragons of the XFL. He played college football at Brigham Young University.

Professional career

Kansas City Chiefs
Koroma was signed by the Kansas City Chiefs as an undrafted free agent on May 7, 2018. He was waived with an injury designation on August 5, 2018. After going unclaimed, he was placed on injured reserve by the Chiefs. He was waived on April 29, 2019.

Houston Roughnecks
Koroma was selected by the Houston Roughnecks in the 2020 XFL Supplemental Draft on November 22, 2019. He had his contract terminated when the league suspended operations on April 10, 2020.

Michigan Panthers
On March 10, 2022, Koroma was drafted by the Michigan Panthers of the United States Football League.

Seattle Sea Dragons
The Seattle Sea Dragons selected Koroma in the seventh round of the 2023 XFL Supplemental Draft on January 1, 2023.

References

External links
BYU Cougars bio
Kansas City Chiefs bio

Further reading

1996 births
Living people
American football centers
BYU Cougars football players
Kansas City Chiefs players
People from Allen, Texas
Players of American football from Texas
Sportspeople from the Dallas–Fort Worth metroplex
Houston Roughnecks players
The Spring League players
Michigan Panthers (2022) players
Seattle Sea Dragons players